Neodexiopsis major is a species of house flies, etc. in the family Muscidae.

References

Muscidae
Articles created by Qbugbot
Insects described in 1920